WJKW (95.9 FM) is a radio station  broadcasting a Contemporary Christian format. Licensed to Athens, Ohio, United States.  The station is currently owned by Christian Faith Broadcast.

References

External links

JKW